Cosmocampus profundus (deepwater pipefish) is a species of marine fish of the family Syngnathidae. It is found near the southeastern US, the Virgin Islands, and the Yucatan Peninsula of Mexico. The few specimens of this species that have been collected were found over sand and coral at depths of 100-265m. This species is ovoviviparous, with males carrying eggs before giving birth to live young.

References

Further reading

WoRMS

profundus
Marine fish
Taxa named by Earl Stannard Herald
Fish described in 1965